WEQY-LP (104.7 FM) is a community radio station licensed to Saint Paul, Minnesota and serves the Dayton's Bluff/East Side neighborhoods. Its broadcast license is held by Dayton's Bluff District Four Community Council.

History 
This station received its original construction permit from the Federal Communications Commission on March 24, 2014. The new station was assigned the WEQY-LP call sign by the FCC on July 4, 2014. WEQY-LP received its license to cover from the FCC on September 15, 2015.

See also
List of community radio stations in the United States

References

External links 
 

 

Community radio stations in the United States
Low-power FM radio stations in Minnesota
Radio stations in Minnesota
Radio stations established in 2015
2015 establishments in Minnesota